Unión Deportiva San Fernando is a Spanish football team based in Maspalomas, in the autonomous community of Canary Islands. Founded in 1992, it plays in Segunda División RFEF – Group 4, holding home matches at Ciudad Deportiva de Maspalomas, with a capacity of 1,000 seats.

History 
The founding act of the club was signed on 15 April 1992 at 7:00 p.m. at the Shopping Center Botánico in the San Fernando district of Maspalomas.

Season to season

1 season in Segunda División RFEF
6 seasons in Tercera División

References

External links
Official website 
La Preferente profile 

Football clubs in the Canary Islands
Sport in Gran Canaria
Association football clubs established in 1992
1992 establishments in Spain